Plainview Township or Plain View Township may refer to:

 Plainview Township, Phillips County, Kansas, in Phillips County, Kansas
 Plainview Township, Wabasha County, Minnesota
 Plain View Township, Sampson County, North Carolina, in Sampson County, North Carolina
 Plainview Township, Stutsman County, North Dakota, in Stutsman County, North Dakota
 Plainview Township, Tripp County, South Dakota

	
Township name disambiguation pages